Silas Palmer Beebe (April 22, 1876 – December 6, 1930) was an American scientist who was an early pioneer in the field of cancer research and the pathology of the disease.

Publications
Beebe, Silas Palmer. (1904). Outlines of Physiological Chemistry. Macmillan.
Beebe, S. P. (1904). THE CHEMISTRY OF MALIGNANT GROWTHS.—FIRST COMMUNICATION. American Journal of Physiology. Legacy Content. 11(2): 139–144.
Beebe, S. P. (1904). THE CHEMISTRY OF MALIGNANT GROWTHS. II.—THE INORGANIC CONSTITUENTS OF TUMORS. American Journal of Physiology. Legacy Content, 12(2): 167–172.
Beebe, S. P. (1905). Cytotoxic serum produced by the injection of nucleoproteids. The Journal of experimental medicine, 7(6): 733–750.
Beebe, S. P., and Philip Shaffer. (1905). "The chemistry of malignant growths. IV. The pentose content of tumors." Amer. Journal of physiol., Bd 14: 231–238.
Beebe, S. P. (1905). Some observations on the path. chem. of tumors. Proc. of the New York Path. Society. (4): 109.
Beebe, S. P., and James Ewing. (1906). "A study of the biology of tumour cells. "The British Medical Journal": 1559–1560.
Ewing, J., & Beebe, S. P. (1906). A study of the so-called infectious lympho-sarcoma of dogs. Journal of Med. Research. 10:209.
Beebe, S. P. (1906). PREPARATION OF A SERUM FOR THE TREATMENT OF EXOPHTHALMIC GOITER. Journal of the American Medical Association, 46(7): 484–487.
Beebe, S. P., and Martha Tracy. (1907). "THE TREATMENT OF EXPERIMENTAL TUMORS WITH BACTERIAL TOXINS." Publications of Cornell University Medical College: Studies from the Departments of Pathology, Bacteriology and Immunology, Public Health & Preventive Medicine. 7: 397.
Rogers, John, and S. P. Beebe. (1908). "THE TREATMENT OF THYROIDISM BY A SPECIFIC CYTOTOXIC SERUM." Medical and surgical report of Bellevue and allied hospitals in the city of New York.... 3: 153.
Crile, Geo W., and S. P. Beebe. (1908). "Transfusion of blood in the transplantable lymphosarcoma of dogs." The Journal of medical research. 18(3): 385.
Berkeley, Wm N., and S. P. Beebe. (1909). "A contribution to the physiology and chemistry of the parathyroid gland." The Journal of medical research. 20(2): 149.
Beebe, S. P. (1911). Present Knowledge of Thyroid Function. Journal of the American Medical Association. 56(9): 658–660.
Van Alstyne, Eleanor Van Ness, and S. P. Beebe. (1913). "Diet Studies in transplantable Tumors: I. The Effect of non-carbohydrate Diet upon the Growth of transplantable Sarcoma in Rats." The Journal of medical research 29(2): 217.
Beebe, S. (1914). The Nerve Control of the Thyroid Gland.
Beebe, S. P. (1915). The serum treatment of hyperthyroidism. Journal of the American Medical Association. 64(5): 413–422.
Beebe, S. P. (1918). Thyroid disease and the war. Med. Rec. (93); 237–238.
Beebe, S. P. (1921). Iodine in the treatment of goiter. Med. Rec. (99): 996–999.

References

1876 births
1930 deaths
Cancer researchers